Adrianos Komnenos was a Byzantine aristocrat and general, and a younger brother of the Byzantine emperor Alexios I Komnenos.

Biography
According to the historian Nikephoros Bryennios, after John's death, Anna entrusted Adrianos and his younger brother Nikephoros to tutors, and gave them an encyclopedic education.

After Alexios's rise to power in 1081, Adrianos was raised to the new dignity of protosebastos, which he shared, for a time, with his brother-in-law Michael Taronites and with the Doge of Venice. According to Zonaras, he was also entrusted with military commands in the campaigns of 1082–1083 against the Normans of Robert Guiscard and Bohemund in Thessaly. Zonaras reports that Alexios gave his brother the imperial regalia, and had him pretend to retreat with his army, so that Alexios himself could strike the pursuing Normans from the rear. However, in the Alexiad, Anna Komnene credits Nikephoros Melissenos with this role, while the Italian chronicler William of Apulia refers to the two persons as one ("the other brother of the Emperor, also known as Melisianus; his name was Adrianos"). Possibly as a reward for his service, in August 1084 Adrianos was given the proceeds of the entire Kassandra peninsula in Chalcidice for life. 

In late 1086 or spring 1087, he succeeded Gregory Pakourianos as domestikos ton scholon of the West, and in 1087, he fought in the Battle of Dristra against the Pechenegs, commanding the Frankish mercenary contingent in the Byzantine centre. The battle ended in a disastrous defeat, and Adrianos barely escaped being captured. Adrianos is mentioned in the Alexiad as having participated in the 1091 campaign against the Pechenegs (along with the protostrator Michael Doukas, he supervised the construction of a bridge over the Evros river), but is not specifically recorded in the final Battle of Levounion.

Shortly after that, at Philippopolis, Adrianos had a major falling-out with his elder brother, the sebastokrator Isaac: the sebastokrator held Adrianos responsible for the accusations of conspiring against the emperor that were raised against his son John, governor of Dyrrhachium. In June 1094, at Serres, Adrianos presided over the court that tried Nikephoros Diogenes, the son of former Emperor Romanos IV, who had tried to assassinate Alexios. Adrianos failed to overcome the obstinacy of Diogenes, who refused to reveal his co-conspirators. In the same year, he is recorded as having participated in the Council of Blachernae that condemned Leo of Chalcedon. 

His date of death is disputed: the commonly accepted date stems from a manuscript which records him retiring to a monastery under the monastic name John, and dying on 19 April 1105. Basile Skoulatos, however, doubts this information, since Adrianos' name is absent from the dead listed in the Kecharitomene typikon (written ), but is present in the Pantokrator typikon of 1136. Hence, Skoulatos has placed Adrianos' death some time between 1118 and 1136.

Family
Adrianos married the porphyrogennete princess Zoe Doukaina, the third daughter of Emperor Constantine X Doukas and Eudokia Makrembolitissa (born ). A number of scholars, including Paul Magdalino, Jean-Claude Cheynet, and Konstantinos Varzos, identify Adrianos and Zoe with a John Komnenos and Anna "of the Doukai" (the latter being Zoe's supposed monastic name) who are mentioned in tomb inscriptions in the Pammakaristos Church in Constantinople as the church's founders, along with their descendants. Adrianos and Zoe had at least three children:
 Alexios Komnenos, his life is obscure. He married and had at least one daughter, but no details are known on his family.
 Unnamed firstborn daughter, otherwise unknown. Varzos suggests the name Anna for her.
Varzos suggests the name Alexia for her.

References

Sources

 
 
 
 

11th-century births
1105 deaths
11th-century Byzantine people
Byzantine generals
Domestics of the Schools
Eastern Orthodox monks
Adrianos
Generals of Alexios I Komnenos
Adrianos
Protosebastoi